Phauloppia is a genus of mites belonging to the family Oribatulidae.

The species of this genus are found in Europe and Northern America.

Species

Species:

Eporibatula gessneri 
Eporibatula longiporosa 
Eporibatula nodifer

References

Acari
Acari genera